Fartullagh, previously Tyrrells country, is a barony in south–east County Westmeath, in the Republic of Ireland. It was formed by 1542. It is bordered by County Offaly to the south and three other baronies: Moycashel (to the west), Moyashel and Magheradernon (to the north) and Farbill (to the north–east).

Geography
The barony contains the eastern half of one large lake, Lough Ennell, the remainder is contained within the barony of Moyashel and Magheradernon. The River Brosna flows through Lough Ennell, eventually connecting with the River Shannon. The M6 motorway passes to the south of Rochfortbridge and Tyrrellspass, which, together with the M4, links Dublin with Galway.

Civil parishes of the barony 
This table lists an historical geographical sub-division of the barony known as the civil parish (not to be confused with an Ecclesiastical parish).

Only three of the townlands in the civil parish of Newtown are in the barony of Fartullagh, the remainder are in the barony of Moycashel. Similarly only four of the townlands in the civil parish of Mullingar are in the barony of Fartullagh, the remainder are in the barony of Moyashel and Magheradernon.

Towns, villages and townlands

Dalystown
Milltownpass
Rochfortbridge
Tyrrellspass

There are 78 townlands in the barony of Fartullagh.

Buildings
Belvedere House and Gardens, built in 1740 as a hunting lodge for Robert Rochfort, 1st Earl of Belvedere by architect Richard Castle, one of Ireland's foremost Palladian architects.

References

External links
Map of Fartullagh at openstreetmap.org
Barony of Fartullagh, County Westmeath at townlands.ie

Baronies of County Westmeath